A slicer is toolpath generation software used in the majority of 3D printing processes for the conversion of a 3D object model to specific instructions for the printer. In particular, the conversion from a model in STL format to printer commands in g-code format in fused filament fabrication and other similar processes.

The slicer first divides the object as a stack of flat layers, followed by describing these layers as linear movements of the 3D printer extruder, fixation laser or equivalent. All these movements, together with some specific printer commands like the ones to control the extruder temperature or bed temperature, are finally written in the g-code file, that can afterwards be transferred to the printer.

Additional features of the slicer 

Nearly all slicers have some additional features, like:

Infill: solid objects need a large amount of valuable material (filament, ...) and print time. The slicer can automatically convert solid volumes to hollow ones, saving costs and time. The hollow object can be partially filled by internal structures, as internal walls, to provide additional robustness. The amount of these structures is called infill density, this parameter being one of the adjustments to be provided to the slicer.

Supports: most of the 3D printing processes create the object layer by layer, down to up, with the layer under construction being deposited over the previous one. As a consequence, all object parts must overlie, at least in some part, over another one. In the case of an object layer that is floating (by example, the flat roof of a house or an horizontally extended arm in a figure), the slicer automatically can add supports for it. The support touches the object in a way that is easily detachable from it at the finish stage of the object production.

 Rafts, skirts and brims: printing of the first object layer, the one in contact with the printer bed, has some peculiarities, like problems of object adherence to the bed, rugosity, smooth deposition of the first amounts of filament, .... The slicer can automatically add some detachable structures to minimize these problems. Usual types of these base structures are   a skirt (a single band around the base of the object without touching it), a brim (several lines of filament around the base of the object, touching it but not under it, and radiating outwards) and rafts (several layers of material that form a detachable base, with the object printed over it).

List of slicer software 

There's a wide collection of slicer applications, some of them free and open-source. Some of the most used ones are:

References 

3D printing
Computer printers
DIY culture
Industrial design
Industrial processes
Emerging technologies